Alprose is a Swiss chocolate producer based in Caslano (Ticino). It was founded in 1957 under the name Titlis SA (in reference to the mountain in the Swiss Alps) and received its current name in 1983.

Products 
Alprose produces a variety of chocolate bars, napolitains and dragées.

According to the company the chocolates is produced CO2-neutrally.

Projects 
The company Alprose is involved in research projects on the Alpine flora, in collaboration with the Swiss National Park. It also collaborates with the Swiss Alpine Club.

Factory 
The factory in Caslano includes a visitor center and museum, which was inaugurated in 1991. An elevated corridor in the factory allows visitors to watch the production of chocolate bars from the cocoa beans.

References

External links
Official website
Visitor center

Swiss chocolate companies
Swiss brands
Brand name chocolate
Food and drink companies established in 1957
Museums in Ticino
Economy of Ticino
Swiss companies established in 1957